Hallothamus decorus is a species of beetle in the family Cerambycidae, and the only species in the genus Hallothamus. It was described by Thomson in 1868.

References

Desmiphorini
Beetles described in 1868
Monotypic beetle genera